Probata is a genus of sea snails, marine gastropod mollusks in the family Mitridae.

Species
Species within the genus Probata include:
 Probata barbadensis (Gmelin, 1791)
 Probata espinosai (Sarasúa, 1978)

References

 Sarasúa H. (1989). Probata subgénero nuevo en Mitra (Prosobranchia, Neogastropoda). Publicações Ocasionais da Sociedade Portuguesa de Malacologia. 13: 35-36.

External links
 Fedosov A., Puillandre N., Herrmann M., Kantor Yu., Oliverio M., Dgebuadze P., Modica M.V. & Bouchet P. (2018). The collapse of Mitra: molecular systematics and morphology of the Mitridae (Gastropoda: Neogastropoda). Zoological Journal of the Linnean Society. 183(2): 253-337

Mitridae
Gastropod genera